Klesztów  is a village in the administrative district of Gmina Żmudź, within Chełm County, Lublin Voivodeship, in eastern Poland.

The village has a population of 87. In Klesztów, there is a former Uniate, now Roman Catholic, church of the Assumption of Mary with illusionistic monumental paintings (1772) signed by painter . He also could be the author of two icons in the side altars (Saint Luke Evangelist, The Communion of Saint Onuphrius).

References

Bibliography 
 Magdalena Ludera, Gabriel Sławiński – późnobarokowy malarz w służbie Kościoła i Cerkwi (= Prace Muzeum Narodowego w Krakowie, vol. 6), Kraków 2016
 Magdalena Ludera, The copy of the Chełm icon of Mother of God in the Orthodox church in Klesztów. Dating, direct inspiration, cult, „Roczniki Teologiczne KUL”, 2016, no. 4: Historia Kościoła, 63, 2016, pp. 109–127

Villages in Chełm County